Sir Lawrence Hugh Jenkins, KCIE (22 December 1857 - 1 October 1928) was a British judge. He was the Chief Justice of Calcutta and Bombay High Court, as well as a member of the Judicial Committee of the Privy Council.

Family
Jenkins was born in 1857 at The Priory, Cardigan. He was the younger son of solicitor Richard David Jenkins and Elizabeth, daughter of Thomas Lewis.

Career
Jenkins passed from Cheltenham College, Oxford and called to Bar Lincoln's Inn in 1883. He became Chief Justice of Bombay High Court for ten years (1898-1908) thereafter Jenkins was selected as Member of the Council of India. On 17 August 1899 he was knighted, and he was appointed a Knight Commander of the Order of the Indian Empire (KCIE) in the 1903 Durbar Honours. Between 1909 to 1915 he was the Chief Justice of Calcutta High Court after Hon'ble Justice Francis William Maclean. He also served as District Grand Master of Freemasons for Bombay and Bengal, took an active part in all important public movements on social questions relating to British India. 

In his judgeship, Jenkins delivered several verdicts in high profile conspiracy and bombing case including Alipore Bomb conspiracy case.

He was sworn of the Privy Council in 1916 and served as a member of the Judicial Committee of the Privy Council.

Death
He died at his home in London on 1 October 1928.

References

1857 births
1928 deaths
Knights Commander of the Order of the Indian Empire
Chief Justices of the Calcutta High Court
British India judges
Members of Lincoln's Inn
20th-century English judges
Chief Justices of the Bombay High Court
Knights Bachelor
Members of the Privy Council of the United Kingdom
Members of the Judicial Committee of the Privy Council